The Missouri State Fair is the state fair for the state of Missouri, which has operated since 1901 in Sedalia, Missouri. It includes daily concerts, exhibits and competitions of animals, homemade crafts, shows, and many food/lemonade stands, and it only lasts 11 days. Its most famous event is the mule show, which has run since its inception. The fairgrounds are located at 2503 W 16th Street on the southwest side of the city at the intersection of West 16th Street (State Highway Y) and South Limit Avenue (U.S. Highway 65).

In 2015, the Missouri State Fair had an attendance of about 350,000 people. It has won numerous first-place and other awards at the annual conference of the International Association of Fairs and Expositions (IAFE), especially for its promotion of agricultural exhibitors.

History
In 1897, N. H. Gentry of Sedalia persuaded the Missouri Swine Breeders Association to request the Missouri General Assembly to establish a state fair.  In 1899, a resolution for the fair was introduced by C.E. Clark.

The state considered locating the fair in Centralia, Chillicothe, Marshall, Mexico, Moberly, and Sedalia. Cities made offers on the amounts of land they would commit to the fair.

After ten ballots, Sedalia received the majority vote; it had bid , the most land of any city to be devoted to the fairgrounds.  The Van Riper family, who had set land aside for the location of the Missouri State Capitol in Jefferson City, Missouri, also donated the site in Sedalia.

The first Missouri State Fair was held September 9–13 in 1901.

Odessa Ice Cream was the official ice cream at the Missouri State Fair in the 1930s.

The fairgrounds was struck by an F2 tornado on August 21, 1952. There was considerable damage along its path, with one person killed and 13 others injured.

The Missouri State Fairgrounds are now used year-round and generate revenue in every season, for more than 350 days out of the available 365.  The fairgrounds hosted the Ozark Music Festival July 19–21, 1974, with an  estimated crowd of 350,000 people. Off-season usage includes music concerts, camper rallies, livestock shows, organized athletic leagues and tournaments, auto races, craft shows, and youth rallies.

The Missouri State Fairgrounds Historic District was listed on the National Register of Historic Places in 1991.  It encompasses 47 contributing buildings, 5 contributing sites, 7 contributing structures, and 7 contributing objects.  The district developed between 1901 and 1941, and includes representative examples of Art Deco, Mission Revival, and Romanesque Revival architecture.  They include several red brick exposition halls and animal barns, concrete drinking fountains constructed by Works Progress Administration, and concession buildings.

The only cancellations were from 1917 to 1918, and 1942 to 1945. In 2020, a youth fair was held as officials cancelled other events caused by the COVID-19 pandemic.

2009
In 2009, the Missouri State Fair celebrated its 107th year.  Attendance increased nearly 8 percent, for a total of 337,851 during the fair's run.  The mild summer encouraged high attendance, and families also liked the fair's affordability as a joint event they could enjoy.

At the end of the year, fair organizers were honored with first-place and other awards at the International Association of Fairs and Expositions (IAFE).  Missouri State Fair Director Mark Wolfe was pleased with the fair's recognition.  First place awards included one for "Overall Program for Competitive Agricultural Exhibitors", an overview of the Fair's entire agricultural program including number of entries, promotional materials and the overall quality of the program.

"This category is among one of the highest honors a fair can receive," said Wolfe. "I am extremely proud to have placed 1st for our continued dedication to showcase agriculture, which is the premise of the Missouri State Fair."

Another first place win was received for the category of "Fair and Sponsor Joint Exhibit Program".  The Fair partnered with Monsanto Corporation in the first annual 4-H Show-Me Robots exhibit.

2010 Events
The 2010 Missouri State Fair was held August 12–22.

Pepsi Grandstand Concerts and Events
 August 12 – Eli Young Band and Candy Coburn
 August 13 – Shinedown (rain-out) and Chevelle
 August 14 – Montgomery Gentry and Lost Trailers
 August 15 – Katharine McPhee with Bomshel
 August 16 – Truck &Tractor Pull 
 August 17 – Lucas Oil Non-Winged Sprint Bandits / MAMS / ULMA 
 August 18 – Country Gold Tour with Leroy Van Dyke, Helen Cornelius, Moe Bandy, Jimmy Fortune, Gene Watson, The Gatlin Brothers, David Frizzell and Narvel Felts
 August 19 – Three Dog Night and The Grass Roots
 August 20 – Darius Rucker and Band Perry
 August 21 – Sheryl Crow and Colbie Caillat
 August 22 – MLRA / NCRA Late Model Challenge

2011 Events
The 2011 Missouri State Fair was held August 11–21. Themed "It's a Show-Me Thing!"

Pepsi Grandstand Concerts and Events
 August 11 – Jerrod Niemann and Candy Coburn
 August 12 – Lynyrd Skynyrd (cancellation due to illness) and Doobie Brothers (performed a longer set)
 August 13 – Jason Aldean with Thompson Square and Chris Young (singer)
 August 14 – Military Appreciation Day with Country Gold Tour featuring Leroy Van Dyke with his band The Auctioneers, Jim Ed Brown, Helen Cornelius, T. Graham Brown, Jeannie Kendall, Eddy Raven, Joe Stampley and Moe Bandy
 August 15 – Championship Truck &Tractor Pull 
 August 16 – Monster Truck Show
 August 17 – Bluegrass Festival throughout the day featuring Missouri's own Rhonda Vincent and the Rage
 August 18 – Kenny Wayne Shepherd with Trampled Under Foot
 August 19 – Luke Bryan and Josh Thompson (singer)
 August 20 – Carnival of Madness Tour featuring Canadian rock band Theory of a Deadman, along with rockers Alter Bridge, Adelitas Way and Emphatic
 August 21 – Auto Racing

See also 
 Mathewson Exhibition Center
 Missouri State Fair Speedway

References

External links
 Missouri State Fair, Official Website
 MissouriNet, News Outlet

State fairs
Missouri culture
Sedalia, Missouri
August events
Tourist attractions in Pettis County, Missouri
Festivals in Missouri
Festivals established in 1901
Fairs in Missouri
Works Progress Administration in Missouri
Historic districts on the National Register of Historic Places in Missouri
Event venues on the National Register of Historic Places in Missouri
Romanesque Revival architecture in Missouri
Mission Revival architecture in Missouri
Art Deco architecture in Missouri
Buildings and structures in Pettis County, Missouri
National Register of Historic Places in Pettis County, Missouri